Bam and Safiabad District is a district (bakhsh) in Esfarayen County, North Khorasan Province, Iran. At the 2006 census, its population was 19,771, in 5,362 families.  The District has one city: Safiabad. The District has two rural districts (dehestan): Bam Rural District and Safiabad Rural District.

References 

Districts of North Khorasan Province
Esfarayen County